Eng Hian (born 17 May 1977) is a retired Indonesian badminton player. A men's doubles specialist, he won major international tournaments, most of them in partnership with Flandy Limpele, between 1999 and 2006. They earned a bronze medal in men's doubles at the 2004 Olympics in Athens. Their victories included the Korea (1999), Denmark (2000), Singapore (2002), and Japan Opens, and the Copenhagen Masters in 2000 and 2004. Hian and Limpele briefly represented England from 2001 until 2003 before returning to PBSI just in time for 2004 Summer Olympics. They were runners-up at the prestigious All-England Championships in 2002. Hian won the Dutch Open with Rian Sukmawan in 2006. He is currently the Indonesia national team women's doubles head coach.

2004 Olympics 
Hian competed in badminton at the 2004 Summer Olympics in men's doubles with partner Flandy Limpele. They had a bye in the first round and defeated Anthony Clark and Nathan Robertson of Great Britain in the second. In the quarterfinals, Hian and Limpele beat Yim Bang-eun and Kim Yong-hyun of Korea 15–1, 15–10. They lost the semifinal to Kim Dong-moon and Ha Tae-kwon, also of Korea, 15–8, 15-2 but won the match against Jens Eriksen and Martin Lundgaard Hansen of Denmark 15–13, 15–7 to finish with the bronze medal.

Achievements

Olympic Games 
Men's doubles

Asian Championships 
Men's doubles

Southeast Asian Games 
Men's doubles

World Junior Championships 
Boys' doubles

IBF Grand Prix 
The World Badminton Grand Prix sanctioned by International Badminton Federation (IBF) since 1983.

Men's doubles

IBF International 
Men's doubles

References

External links 
 BWF Player Profile

1977 births
Living people
People from Surakarta
Sportspeople from Central Java
Indonesian sportspeople of Chinese descent
Indonesian Hokkien people
Indonesian male badminton players
English male badminton players
Badminton players at the 2000 Summer Olympics
Badminton players at the 2004 Summer Olympics
Olympic badminton players of Indonesia
Olympic bronze medalists for Indonesia
Olympic medalists in badminton
Medalists at the 2004 Summer Olympics
Competitors at the 1999 Southeast Asian Games
Southeast Asian Games gold medalists for Indonesia
Southeast Asian Games silver medalists for Indonesia
Southeast Asian Games medalists in badminton
Badminton coaches
World No. 1 badminton players
Indonesian expatriate sportspeople in England